Banaszak is a Polish surname. Notable people with the surname include:

Greg Banaszak (born 1966), American saxophonist
Hanna Banaszak (born 1957), Polish jazz singer and poet
John Banaszak (born 1950), American football coach and former player
Pete Banaszak (born 1944), American college and professional football player
Piotr Banaszak (born 1964), Polish weightlifter

 Banaszek

Polish-language surnames
pl:Banaszak
de:Banaszak